Jonas Brondum Andersen, is a Danish speedway rider, born 5 September 1992, Strøm, Denmark. In December 2015 he signed to ride for the Redcar Bears in the British Speedway Premier League and continues with them in the 2018 British SGB Championship.

References

External links 
 Profile

1992 births
Living people
Danish speedway riders
Redcar Bears riders